Enrique Finot (16 September 1891 – 23 December 1952) was a Bolivian historian writer, editor, and diplomat. He served as foreign minister under Colonel David Toro and during the period of his nationalizing Standard Oil. He has been described as conservative.

References

External links

 

People from Santa Cruz de la Sierra
Foreign ministers of Bolivia
Bolivian male writers
1891 births
1952 deaths
Bolivian diplomats